San Gimignanello is a village in Tuscany, central Italy, administratively a frazione of the comune of Rapolano Terme, province of Siena.

San Gimignanello is about 34 km from Siena and 8 km from Rapolano Terme.

Bibliography 
 

Frazioni of Rapolano Terme